The Church of St Thomas of Canterbury in Lovington, Somerset, England, was built in the 13th century. It is a Grade II* listed building.

History

The church was built in the 13th century and underwent Victorian restoration in 1861.

The parish is part of the Six Pilgrims benefice within the Diocese of Bath and Wells.

Architecture

The stone building has Doulting stone dressings and slate or clay tile roofs. It consists of a three-bay nave, two-bay chancel and north aisle. The three-stage tower is supported by corner buttresses. There are three bells in the tower dating from the 15th and 17th centuries.

The majority of fittings in the church are from the 19th century but it does have door arches, a piscina and ambry surviving from the original building.

In the churchyard is an early 17th century chest tomb to the Danyell family.

See also  
 List of ecclesiastical parishes in the Diocese of Bath and Wells

References

Grade II* listed buildings in South Somerset
Grade II* listed churches in Somerset
Church of England church buildings in South Somerset